Notographus is a genus of beetles in the family Buprestidae, containing the following species:

 Notographus hieroglyphicus (Macleay, 1872)
 Notographus sulcipennis (Macleay, 1872)
 Notographus uniformis (Macleay, 1888)
 Notographus yorkensis Obenberger, 1922

References

Buprestidae genera